Basement Peak is a mountain in British Columbia, Canada, located  northeast of Buckwell Peak and  northeast of Pleasant Camp. The name is not official.

References

Two-thousanders of British Columbia
Saint Elias Mountains